Bordiga may refer to:

Amadeo Bordiga (1889–1970), Italian communist
Giovanni Bordiga (1854–1933), Italian mathematician
Bordiga surface, a mathematical surface introduced by Giovanni Bordiga